The Central Policy Unit, established in 1989, was responsible for advising the Chief Executive (previously the Governor) of Hong Kong. It was replaced with the Policy Innovation and Co-ordination Unit in 2018.

Previous heads
 Leo Goodstadt (1989-1997)
 Gordon Siu (1997-1999)
 Edgar Cheng Wai-kin (1999-2001)
 Lau Siu Kai (2002-2012)
 Shiu Sin-por (2012-2017)

Previous members include
 Vincent Cheng Hoi-chuen (1989-1991)
 Tsang Tak-sing (曾德成) (1998-2007)
John Bacon-Shone (1998-2001)
Joseph Lian Yi-Zheng (1998-2004)

References

External links
 Website of the Central Policy Unit

1989 establishments in Hong Kong
2018 disestablishments in Hong Kong
Hong Kong government departments and agencies
Political and economic think tanks based in Hong Kong
Think tanks established in 1989